The Rally of the Guinean People (sometimes translated as Guinean People's Assembly; RPG) is a political party in Guinea. The RPG was the ruling party in the country from 2010 to 2021 and was recently led by Alpha Condé. It is mainly based amongst the Mandinka population.

The party boycotted the parliamentary election held on 30 June 2002.

Following the dismissal of Lansana Kouyaté as Prime Minister and his replacement by Ahmed Tidiane Souaré on 20 May 2008, the RPG denounced Kouyaté's dismissal and, unlike other opposition parties, declined to attend a meeting with Souaré on 28 May to discuss the formation of a national unity government. According to the RPG, positive change would not come as long as President Lansana Conté remained in power, regardless of who was Prime Minister or who was included in the government, and the party said that it would not participate in the government.

The party is affiliated to the Progressive Alliance and Socialist International.

Electoral history

Presidential elections

National Assembly elections

References

Full member parties of the Socialist International
Political parties in Guinea
Progressive Alliance